Sir Francis Blake, 3rd Baronet (c. 1774 – 10 September 1860) was a landowner, politician and baronet of Northumberland, England.

Background
Born at Heston, he was the son of Sir Francis Blake, 2nd Baronet and his wife, the daughter of Alexander Douglas. In 1818, he succeeded his father as baronet.

Career
Blake was commissioned captain in the Northumberland Militia in 1794 and was appointed colonel of the Northumberland Fencibles in 1795. He entered the British House of Commons in 1820, sitting as member of parliament (MP) for Berwick-upon-Tweed until 1826. A year later, he was re-elected for the constituency, representing it until 1834. Blake owned estates at Twizell Castle, Tillmouth House, Seghill and Duddo, which later he sold for £45000 in 1823.

Death and legacy
He married Jane, daughter of William Neale, in 1827 but had no legitimate children and the baronetcy became extinct on his death. His illegitimate son Frederick Blake (1835–1909) suffered severe sunstroke while serving as an army officer and was confined to a mental asylum in 1873. His father granted him a life interest in property at Seghill and also bequeathed Helen, the widow of his brother Robert Dudley Blake (1776–1860). Blake's principal beneficiary was Captain Francis Blake (1832–1861) whose son Francis Douglas Blake was created a baronet in his own right in 1907. The family repurchased Seghill Park from the Treasury Solicitor following the intestacy of Helen Blake.

References

External links
 

1770s births
1860 deaths
British Militia officers
British Fencibles officers
Royal Northumberland Fusiliers officers
Blake, Francis, 3rd Baronet, of Twizell
Members of the Parliament of the United Kingdom for English constituencies
UK MPs 1820–1826
UK MPs 1826–1830
UK MPs 1830–1831
UK MPs 1831–1832
UK MPs 1832–1835